The 1892–93 season was Newton Heath's first season in the Football League. They finished last in Division One championship with 18 points and due to the absence of formal relegation from the league they were one of the teams that had to win a test match against a Second Division team in order to retain their place in the league for the following season.  They beat Birmingham City after two matches to remain in the top division. Newton Heath lost to Blackburn Rovers in their opening match in the FA Cup this season.

Football League First Division

Test match

FA Cup

Lancashire Senior Cup

Manchester Senior Cup

References

Manchester United F.C. seasons
Newton Heath